The Booth Cooperage is located in Bayfield, Wisconsin.

History
The Booth Cooperage was one of several buildings that made up a fishery. Barrels for packing the fish were assembled within the building. More recently, the site has been used by a kayak outfitting business. It was listed on the National Register of Historic Places in 1976.

References

Agricultural buildings and structures on the National Register of Historic Places in Wisconsin
Industrial buildings and structures on the National Register of Historic Places in Wisconsin
National Register of Historic Places in Bayfield County, Wisconsin
Fish hatcheries in the United States